Scoil Mhuire was founded in 1951 by the late Miss Katherine M. Cahill, M.A., Miss O’Donovan, M.A and Miss Joan O’Donovan, M.A (who later joined the Dominican Order). The school opened at 2 Sidney Place, Cork City, with 70 pupils aged from nine to seventeen years.

In 1954 when Scoil Ite closed, most of its pupils and some staff transferred to Scoil Mhuire, which then became an all age school from kindergarten upwards. Over the years, the buildings occupied by the school have been extended by purchasing adjoining properties. Pupil numbers now exceed 400.

Scoil Mhuire seeks to develop the full potential of each individual girl and to recognise that each pupil who enrols is unique, with different gifts and different needs.

Notable Alumni

 Clodagh McKenna, TV presenter
 Alison Oliver, actor
 Fiona Shaw, actor
 Siobhán McSweeney, actor
 Karen Creed

References

External links
 

Girls' schools in the Republic of Ireland
Secondary schools in County Cork
Educational institutions established in 1951
Education in Cork (city)
Private schools in the Republic of Ireland
Buildings and structures in Cork (city)
1951 establishments in Ireland